Jalta, Jalta is a Croatian musical from 1971. Libretto for the musical was written by Milan Grgić, and the director is Vlado Štefančić. Author of the music is the Croatian composer Alfi Kabiljo. First performance was on 28 December 1971 in Zagreb at the theatre Komedija.

Plot
The musical takes place in Yalta, Ukraine, during the Yalta Conference, while Winston Churchill, Joseph Stalin and Franklin Roosevelt were dividing the world. Three valets have arrived to Yalta with them: the Russian, Griša; the American, Larry; and the British, Stanley. They were in charge of guarding and airing out of laundry for the Big Three.

The valets are all placed in the old Aramovski villa, in which the housekeeper Nina Filipovna takes care that everybody lives in friendship and unity. They, too, start to discuss the dividing of the world, and maybe they would succeed if there wasn't for the "Green Meadow", a small piece of land in the Antarctic of which the Big Three are completely oblivious.

In the meantime, the generals and delegates attending the conference start to notice strange things on the great map of the world located in the recreation room. A mysterious green spot is forming in the Antarctic. All the generals and delegates become upset.

There is a silent war among the valets. They keep getting into conflicts over everything. Nina tries to be the mediator of the group. She splits everything to three equal parts, even a branch they use to dry their clothes. But, open conflict develops among the valets because of that branch. Griša, unbeknownst to the others, starts hanging his clothes all over the whole branch. The others catch him red-handed and a big fight ensues. There is a danger that all of the valets will leave the villa. So, Nina intervenes. She decides to be gentle to each and every one of them. However, it is discovered that she is gentle only with Larry and Stanley. Griša is infuriated. He was betrayed. Open conflict ensues among the valets. A duel.

While they are fighting, a bomb, which is located in the garden of the villa, activates. It starts to spin out of control, begins to smoke and make strange noises. Everybody panics and escapes before it explodes.

Meanwhile, the green spot on the map keeps growing. The generals manage to find out that Nina Filipovna knows something more about that spot. Agents act at once, and arrest Nina. They question her, but she doesn't say anything.

The day of departure comes. Valets are packing. The Aramovski villa is damaged in the bomb explosion, and all of the valets wear bandages.

The agents and generals wish to know everything about the "Green Meadow". Valets don't say a thing. Then Nina is brought in the room with her hands tied behind her back. Out of fear for Nina, valets agree that they are ready to say everything about the "Green Meadow", under the condition that Nina is let go. The generals persuade all of them that they have no intentions of dividing the "Green Meadow". They just wanted to know if there was grass, flowers or butterflies there. When they are told that there was all of those things there and more, the generals are thrilled that there is a piece of land in the world which belongs to no-one and which won't be divided.

Nina is released. She and the valets make a deal that all of them will go to the "Green Meadow" together some day. And who knows, maybe the whole world will become a green meadow some day.

The musical ends with all of the participants singing the song "Neka cijeli ovaj svijet" ("May This Whole World").

Music

Music for Jalta, Jalta was composed by Alfi Kabiljo, which made him famous. Musical is composed of those songs:

 Uvertira (Overture)
 Mi smo agenti (We are the agents)
 Tri sobara (Three valets)
 Zelena livada (Green meadow)
 Whisky, votka, gin
 Mi radimo (We work)
 Jalta, Jalta (Yalta, Yalta)
 Peri, peri (Wash, wash)
 Nek se zrači (Air it out)
 Čunčurluk
 Povuci, potegni (Pull, yank)
 Što će biti sutra (What will be tomorrow)
 Govori, Nina (Speak, Nina)
 Na Antarktik (To the Antarctic)
 Neka cijeli ovaj svijet (May this whole world)

References

External links
Jalta, Jalta synopsis 
Article about the 2010 production of Jalta Jalta 

Croatian music history
1971 musicals
Musicals about World War II
Theatre in Croatia
Works set in Crimea
Croatian musicals